Montaña Suiza ("The Swiss Mountain" in English) is a steel scenic railway roller coaster located at Monte Igueldo Amusement Park, on the coast at San Sebastián, Spain. It was designed and built by German engineer Erich Heidrich and opened at the site in 1928. It is the oldest steel roller coaster still operating in the world.

The ride was built with wooden running rails in a trough, like usual scenic railways. The trough is partially set into the landscape and is of concrete construction. The ride lacks the traditional supporting trestles of scenic railways. Instead, the track runs in depressions set into the ground and along the top of a coastal wall at one point. The running rails were changed to steel at a later unknown date

The roller coaster operates with two trains, each of which are composed of two 2x5 person cars. The cars are wooden in construction and ride on steel bogies, like the scenic railways at Margate, UK, Great Yarmouth Pleasure Beach, UK and Luna Park, Melbourne. A brakeman rides on board each train to control its speed.

References

Videos

Onride, from the rear car, the ride operator is between the cars
Onride, first seats

Roller coasters in Spain
Roller coasters introduced in 1928
1928 establishments in Spain
Roller coasters with brakemen